Hwang Jini is a Korean drama broadcast on KBS2 in 2006. The series was based on the tumultuous life of Hwang Jini, who lived in 16th-century Joseon and became the most famous gisaeng in Korean history. Lead actress Ha Ji-won won the Grand Prize (Daesang) at the 2006 KBS Drama Awards for her performance.

The series was popular in the ratings, giving rise to a boom in gisaeng-themed entertainment—musicals, TV dramas, films, even cartoons.

Synopsis
Hwang Jini is the illegitimate child of a nobleman and Hyun Geum, a blind gisaeng. A gisaeng is a singer, dancer and hostess who lives a life catering to the whims of the yangban elite. Fearing that her young daughter will follow in her footsteps and determined that she should become more than a mere plaything for men, Hyun Geum sends Jini to a remote mountain temple to be cared for by an old monk. But one day, the seven-year-old Jini slips away from the temple and comes across a gisaeng performance, and is drawn to her destiny. Enraptured by the beauty of their singing and dancing, Jini runs away and enters the gibang, or gisaeng house, where she meets her mother for the first time. They discover that she displays an outstanding talent for dancing and playing the geomungo. From that day on, Jini trains to become Joseon's top gisaeng. She studies under Im Baek-moo, one of the best court dancers in the kingdom and a harsh and manipulative teacher.

Jini then falls in love with Kim Eun-ho, son of a powerful nobleman, but his parents refuse to accept the relationship due to the difference in their social status. Jini's first love ends in tragedy when in a futile attempt to elope with her, Eun-ho catches pneumonia and dies.

Unable to forget Eun-ho, Jini no longer has any desire to dance; for the next five years, she spends her days making music and conversation with the middle class (becoming enormously wealthy in the process) and her nights drowning herself in misery and alcohol. While drunk, she decides to kill herself, but the poet Kim Jung-han saves her. Thus, Jini begins a troubled love affair with Jung-han. Meanwhile, she continually rejects Byuk Kye-soo, a royal relative who is obsessed with her, and faces off against Bu-yong, her rival in dancing and love. At Jini's side in times of need is her devoted bodyguard Yi-saeng. Jini later finds out that Baek-moo's scheming had a hand in Eun-ho's death, and jealousy and bitterness build between the two as they prepare for what turns out to be a fateful performance of the crane dance.

In an age when women were treated as if they were invisible, Hwang Jini becomes a celebrated gisaeng-singer-dancer-poet of the 16th century. Her beauty, wit and intellect propels her from obscurity into the company of Joseon's most powerful aristocrats, eventually winning the acclaim of King Jungjong and his court. In a relentlessly class-based society, Hwang Jini was a woman ahead of her time, who pursued art relentlessly and saw life in beautiful colors. She was both revered and reviled in her lifetime, and left her mark in history.

Cast

Main
 Ha Ji-won as Hwang Jini
 Shim Eun-kyung as young Hwang Jini
 Kim Young-ae as Im Baek-moo
 Wang Bit-na as Bu-yong
 Kim Jaewon as Kim Jung-han
 Ryu Tae-joon as Byuk Kye-soo
 Jang Keun-suk as Kim Eun-ho
 Jeon Mi-seon as Jin Hyun-geum, Hwang Jini's mother 
 Lee Shi-hwan as Yi-saeng
 Kim Bo-yeon as Mae-hyang

Supporting
Jo Sung-ha as Eom-soo
Lee In-hye as Gae-ddong/Danshim
Jung Kyung-soon as Geum-choon
Song Yi-woo as Aeng-moo
Yoo Yeon-ji as Seom-seom
Kim Sun-hwa as Gae-ddong's maid
Jo Ye-na as Hyang-rim
Mi Se as Ae-rang
Lee Ji-eun as Geum-hong
Hwang Eun-ha as Han Yeon-woo/Wol-hyang
Hyun Seok as Sung Ik-hwan
Seo Hyun-jin as Jung Ka-eun
Kim Seung-wook as Jang Soo-man
Lee Dae-ro as Joo-ji
Jo Jae-wan as Jang-yi
Lee Hee-do as Kim Cham-pan
Ahn Hae-sook as Lady Cha
Moon Chun-shik as Deok-pal
Jung Sang-hoon as Sang-soo
Choi Sang-hoon as Jung-chook
Yoon Jae-rang as Yeon-hong
Park Kwi-soon as Sang Jwa-seung
Son Seong-yoon as Gisaeng
Lee In

Production
The shooting schedule for Hwang Jini was particularly arduous for a television series, sometimes going on for seven days  without a break. In addition to such popular younger actors as Ha Ji-won, Wang Bit-na, Kim Jaewon and Jang Keun-suk, the series featured many noted veteran Korean actors, including Kim Young-ae and Kim Bo-yeon. The costumes (designed by Kim Hye-sun), dances and music in the series were noted for their flamboyance and sensuality.

Ratings

Source: TNS Media Korea

Notes

See also
 Hwang Jin Yi (film)
 Eoudong

References

External links 
  
 
 
 

Korean Broadcasting System television dramas
2006 South Korean television series debuts
2006 South Korean television series endings
Korean-language television shows
Television series by KBS Media
South Korean historical television series
Television series set in the Joseon dynasty
Television shows based on South Korean novels